Dhofar may refer to:

Animals 
 Dhofar shrew
 Dhofar leaf-toed gecko

Events 
 Dhofar Rebellion

Places 
 Dhofar Governorate, a Governorate of Oman
 Dhofar Mountains, a mountain range of southern Oman

Other 
 Dhofari Arabic
 Dhofar Club